Ellison Edwin Ketchum (July 22, 1908 – November 21, 1960) was an American football and basketball player, coach, and college athletics administrator. He was the head football coach at the University of Denver for one season in 1942, compiling a record of 6–3–1.  Ketchum served two stints as the head basketball coach at Denver, from 1940 to 1943 and from 1946 to 1948, amassing a record of 63–60.

Biography
Ketchum was born on July 22, 1908, in Colorado Springs, Colorado. He graduated from the University of Denver, where he lettered in football and basketball, in 1930.  Ketchum died of cancer on November 21, 1960 in Coral Gables, Florida.

Head coaching record

Football

References

1908 births
1960 deaths
American men's basketball players
Basketball coaches from Colorado
Basketball players from Colorado Springs, Colorado
Deaths from cancer in Florida
Denver Pioneers athletic directors
Denver Pioneers football coaches
Denver Pioneers football players
Denver Pioneers men's basketball coaches
Denver Pioneers men's basketball players
Sportspeople from Colorado Springs, Colorado
Players of American football from Colorado Springs, Colorado